Jersey is a knit fabric used predominantly for clothing manufacture. It was originally made of wool, but is now made of wool, cotton and synthetic fibers.

History
Since medieval times, Jersey, Channel Islands, where the material was first produced, had been an important exporter of knitted goods and the fabric in wool from Jersey became well known. 

In 1916, Gabrielle "Coco" Chanel upset the fashion industry by using jersey at a time when it was strictly associated with underwear. "This designer made jersey what it is today—we hope she's satisfied," said Vogue in 1999. "It's almost as much part of our lives as blue serge is."

Structure 
Jersey is a weft knit fabric that is knitted on a single set of needles with all loops meshing in the same direction. By and large, it is knitted in plain stitch. It is also called plain. On the other hand, the double jersey is knit using two sets of needles, does not curl at the edges (when cut) and has a more stable structure.

Types 
The fabric can be a very stretchy single knitting, usually light-weight, jersey with one flat side and one piled side. When made with a lightweight yarn, this is the fabric most often used to make T-shirts.   

Or it can be a double knitted jersey (interlock jersey), with less stretch, that creates a heavier fabric of two single jerseys knitted together to leave the two flat sides on the outsides of the fabric, with the piles in the middle. Interlock jersey is sometimes used as a more formal alternative knit to the traditional piqué knit for polo shirts and is generally the preferred knit for those made from pima cotton.  

Jersey is considered to be an excellent fabric for draped garments, such as dresses and women's tops. 

The following types of jersey can be distinguished:

 Single jersey
 Double jersey
 Interlock jersey
 Jacquard jersey
 Clocqué jersey
 Stretch jersey

See also 
 Balbriggan (cloth)
 Kersey (cloth)

References

Jersey
Knitted fabrics